The yellow rasbora (Rasbora lateristriata) is a species of ray-finned fish in the genus Rasbora from Southeast Asia. It is a primarily freshwater fish originally from Java island in Indonesia. It is known as the Wader pari fish in the Indonesian language. In addition, it was a protein source for the local community during the old days.

The taxonomy, phylogeny, and distributional boundary have not been fully studied yet.

Distribution 
The species can be found in Indonesia, Thailand, Malaysia, Vietnam, Philippines, Singapore and the United States. The distribution is pretty reliable according to their Genus distribution in which they are native to freshwater habitats in South, Southeast Asia, and southeast China.

However, a journal had stated that R. lateristriata had a west-to-east direction of divergence and migration from Miocene to Plio-Pleistocene. R. lateristriata is often considered to be widely distributed from Sumatra, Java, Bali, across Wallace's Line, to Lombok and Sumbawa Islands of Indonesia (e.g., Froese and Pauly, 2015).

Habitat and feeding habit
It is a type of riverine fish found in mountainous streams that are in shallow areas, and have relatively fast flowing water and plenty of gravel at the river floor. 

The fish is an omnivorous feeder which feeds on phytoplankton, zooplankton, insect larvae, leaves, and small caterpillars. It feeds continuously through the day and night. It is hunted down by snake head and red devil fish in the natural ecosystem.

Spawning site 
The requirement for the spawning site is to have clean water flows smoothly, shallow, available enough of sand and gravel, and no garbage around them. Depth of the spawning site  is about 30 cm. Artificial induced spawning is unknown.

Morphology 
Dorsal spines (total): 2; Dorsal soft rays (total): 7; Anal spines: 3; Anal soft rays: 5. Preserved color dark brown dorsally, whitish to yellowish on sides and below; scales margined with minute dark spots; opercle with silvery black spot. 12 scales between nape and dorsal. Mouth strongly oblique with anterior end as high as upper margin of pupil; maxillary extends posteriorly below anterior margin of eye. Lateral line complete, reaching caudal, with 7 rows of scales between lateral lines over middle of caudal peduncle.

Incident 
The eruption of Kelud Volcano on February 13, 2014 released a huge amount of volcanic dust and nearly covered the whole of Java island. The exposure of fish to the volcanic dust dissolved in the water affected and caused change to the histological structure of the gills and intestine, but did not have an effect on the histological structure of the eyes, liver and gonad of the wader pari fish.

Current status 
R. lateristriata is at vulnerable according to IUCN Red List and the population is declining with numbers from 10,000 to 100,000 mature individuals. The original habitat which used to be moderately abundant is becoming rare which leads to less opportunity for a researcher to do sampling. The declining population trend was probably caused by declining and inconsistent rainfall.

References 

Rasboras
Freshwater fish of Indonesia
Freshwater fish of Malaysia
Freshwater fish of the Philippines
Fish of Thailand
Fish of Vietnam
Fish of the Mekong Basin
Taxa named by Pieter Bleeker
Fish described in 1854